Think Small was one of the most famous ads in the advertising campaign for the Volkswagen Beetle, art-directed by Helmut Krone. The copy for Think Small was written by Julian Koenig at the Doyle Dane Bernbach (DDB) agency in 1959. Doyle Dane Bernbach's Volkswagen Beetle campaign was ranked as the best advertising campaign of the twentieth century by Ad Age, in a survey of North American advertisements. Koenig was followed by many other writers during Krone's art-directorship of the first 100 ads of the campaign, most notably Bob Levenson. The campaign has been considered so successful that it "did much more than boost sales and build a lifetime of brand loyalty [...] The ad, and the work of the ad agency behind it, changed the very nature of advertising—from the way it's created to what you see as a consumer today."

Background
Fifteen years after World War II, the United States had become a world and consumer superpower; and cars began to be built for growing families with Baby Boomer children and "Americans obsessed with muscle cars". The Beetle, a "compact, strange-looking automobile", was manufactured in a plant built by the Nazis in Wolfsburg, Germany, which was perceived to make it more challenging to sell the vehicle (since the car was designed in Nazi Germany). Automobile advertisements back then focused on providing as much information as possible to the reader instead of persuading the reader to purchase a product, and the advertisements were typically rooted more in fantasy than in reality.

Campaign
Helmut Krone came up with the design for "Lemon" and "Think Small" simultaneously. Krone teamed up with copywriter Julian Koenig to develop the "Think Small" and "Lemon" ads for Volkswagen under the supervision of William Bernbach. DDB built a print campaign that focused on the Beetle's form, which was smaller than most of the cars being sold at the time. This unique focus in an automobile advertisement brought wide attention to the Beetle. DDB had "simplicity in mind, contradicting the traditional association of automobiles with luxury". Print advertisements for the campaign were filled mostly with white space, with a small image of the Beetle shown, which was meant to emphasize its simplicity and minimalism, and the text and fine print that appeared at the bottom of the page listed the advantages of owning a small car.

The creative execution broke with convention in a number of ways. Although the layout used the traditional format - image, headline and three-column body were retained, other differences were subtle yet sufficient to make the advertisement stand out. It used a sans-serif font at a time when serif fonts were normal. It included a full-stop after the tagline "Think Small."  The body-copy was full of widows and orphans - all designed to give the ad a natural and honest feel. The image of the car was placed in the top left-hand corner and angled in a way that directed the reader's attention toward the headline. Finally, the ad was printed in black and white, at a time when full colour advertisements were widely used. Over time, the layout changed but the essential executional elements were used consistently to give each iteration exhibited a sense of a "house style".

Books
A 1967 promotional book titled Think Small was distributed as a giveaway by Volkswagen dealers. Charles Addams, Bill Hoest, Virgil Partch, Gahan Wilson and other top cartoonists of that decade drew cartoons showing Volkswagens, and these were published along with amusing automotive essays by such humorists as H. Allen Smith, Roger Price and Jean Shepherd. The book's design juxtaposed each cartoon alongside a photograph of the cartoon's creator.

The campaign has been the subject of a number of books, with serious scholarly analysis of the campaign's key success factors, including: Think Small: The Story of those Volkswagen Ads by Frank Rowsome (1970);  Think Small: The Story of the World's Greatest Ad (2011) by Dominik Imseng;  and Thinking Small: The Long, Strange Trip of the Volkswagen Beetle (2012) by Andrea Hiott;

See also

 Volkswagen advertising

References

Further reading
 
 
Marcantonio, Alfredo & David Abbott. "Remember those great Volkswagen ads?" London: Booth-Clibborn Editions, 1993. 
 Imseng, Dominik. Ugly Is Only Skin-Deep: The Story of the Ads That Changed the World. Matador, 2016. 
Challis, Clive. "Helmut Krone. The book. Graphic Design and Art Direction (concept, form and meaning) after advertising's Creative Revolution)." London: Cambridge Enchorial Press, 2005. 

Advertising campaigns
American advertising slogans
German advertising slogans
1950s neologisms
Volkswagen Beetle